The Christmas Toy is a 1986 television film directed by Eric Till and produced by The Jim Henson Company, featuring Jim Henson's Muppets, including Rugby the Tiger who remembers how he was the Christmas Toy last year, and thinks he is going to be unwrapped again this year. The film, which originally aired on December 6, 1986 on ABC, was sponsored by Kraft Foods. The film has many plot points that are notably similar to Toy Story, which was released 9 years later.

Originally introduced by Kermit the Frog, it was released on VHS format in 1993. In 2008, HIT Entertainment (distributed by Lionsgate) released the special on DVD, but edited out Kermit's opening introduction due to legal issues with Disney. When it was released on Amazon Prime, Kermit's scenes were reinstated.

The film later inspired a spin-off television series titled Secret Life of Toys.

Plot
When no people are around, the toys still play in the playroom. But since a toy will be frozen forever if a person catches it out of position, they have to be very careful. It's Christmas Eve, and Rugby the Tiger remembers how he was the favorite Christmas toy last year and wants to be the favorite again this year, not be replaced by another toy. However, he does not realize that if Jamie unwrapped him again this year, she would see him out of his normal place that she usually puts him and he'd be frozen forever. Mew, the cat's toy mouse, follows him out of the playroom to help him after informing the other toys that Rugby left.

Meanwhile, Apple the Doll, whom Rugby supplanted as favorite toy, leads a group of toys out of the playroom to rescue Rugby. Once they meet up with him in the living room, Apple tries to tell him what Christmas is really about. But Rugby refuses to believe her, and tries to get into the Christmas package and lets loose Meteora, Queen of the Asteroids, who does not know she is a toy, and thinks she has landed among aliens. The other toys must get Rugby out of the box and Meteora back in it before they are found and frozen forever.

But Mew is caught, and frozen. Only then does Rugby realize what a good friend Mew has been to him, and how selfishly he has been acting. Rugby sings, telling Mew how much he cares for him. This brings Mew back to life, and then the other toys also know how to revive their other frozen friends.

On the morning of Christmas Day, Jamie and Jesse enjoy their new toys alongside their current toys. While the kids are away, the toys sing "Together at Christmas". Kermit joins in at the end of the special.

Featured cast

Muppet performers

See also
 List of Christmas films

References

External links
 

1986 television films
1986 films
1980s Christmas films
The Muppets television specials
American Christmas films
American television films
Christmas television films
Films directed by Eric Till
Films about sentient toys